Jacob Stanley Dudman (born 22 August 1997) is an English actor, writer and filmmaker. He is known for his roles in Netflix programs The Stranger (2020), Medici (2019), Fate: The Winx Saga (2021-2022) and the BBC iPlayer series The A List (2018); as well as various Doctor Who audio dramas for Big Finish Productions.

Early life
Dudman grew up in Ripon, North Yorkshire. He attended St Aidan's Church of England High School. He then studied Film Production at the London College of Communication, a branch of University of the Arts London.

Career

Filmmaking and YouTube
As a teenager, Dudman uploaded short films, impressions and comedic sketches on his YouTube channel, which gained him over 100,000 subscribers. 
In 2016 Dudman directed the 23-minute documentary Save The Rhino Vietnam, in which he and actor Paul Blackthorne travelled to Vietnam to investigate the rhino horn trade and raise awareness for the rhino-extinction plight.

In 2017 he co-wrote, directed and starred in comedy sketches The Great Curator and The Solo Jedi with Jon Culshaw and provided narration for the web-documentary The Almost Doctors, created by multi-media artist Stuart Humphryes. Later in the year, he also directed and produced a 10 minute behind the scenes documentary of Doctor Who for BBC Worldwide.

Acting
In 2018, Dudman was cast as Dev in The A List, a BBC iPlayer original series. Later in the year, Dudman played a role in the third season of Medici as Giulio de Medici, released in December 2019. In 2019, Dudman joined the cast of two new titles set to be released in 2020: The Stranger (based on a Harlan Coben novel) and Fate: The Winx Saga (based on the Italian Nickelodeon cartoon Winx Club).

Doctor Who
Dudman has voiced the roles of the Tenth, Eleventh and Twelfth Doctors as part of the Doctor Who audio drama range for Big Finish Productions. He has voiced many other roles for different Big Finish titles, including the Doctor Who main range. In 2020, Dudman narrated the short film Farewell, Sarah Jane written by Russell T Davies, which was aired on the anniversary of Elisabeth Sladen's death.

Personal life
Dudman's godfather is actor Paul Blackthorne.

Filmography

Doctor Who audio dramas

As the Doctor/narrator 
Doctor Who: The Tenth Doctor Chronicles (2018) (co-starring Jacqueline King, Michelle Ryan, Jon Culshaw and Arinzé Kene)
Doctor Who: The Eleventh Doctor Chronicles (2018) (co-starring Danny Horn, Simon Fisher-Becker, Nathalie Buscombe and Eleanor Crooks)
Doctor Who: The Twelfth Doctor Chronicles (2020) (co-starring Samuel Anderson, Ingrid Oliver, Emily Redpath and Mandi Symonds)

Other roles 
Doctor Who: The Third Doctor Adventures: Storm of the Horofax (2017) (as UNIT Radio Operator)
The War Master: The Good Master (2017) (as Arcking 12 Computer)
Doctor Who: The Helliax Rift (2018) (as Samuel)
Doctor Who: The Seventh Doctor: The New Adventures: Vanguard (2018) (as Cannon)
The Lives of Captain Jack: Driving Miss Wells (2019) (as William)
The Lives of Captain Jack: R&J (2020) (as Snorvlast/The Ninth Doctor)
Torchwood: Ex-Machina (2020) (as Luke)
Doctor Who Time Lord Victorious: The Enemy of my Enemy (2020) (as Security Guard 2)

Audiobook readings 
Doctor Who Short Trips: Dead Media (2019)
Doctor Who Short Trips: The Best-Laid Plans (2019)
Doctor Who: Paradise Lost (2020)
Doctor Who Short Trips: Regeneration Impossible (2020)
Doctor Who Short Trips: Her Own Bootstraps (2020)
Doctor Who Time Lord Victorious: The Minds of Magnox (2020)
Doctor Who Short Trips: Free Speech (2020)

References

External links
 
 

1997 births
Living people
Actors from Harrogate
Alumni of the London College of Communication
English male television actors
English male voice actors
Entertainers from Yorkshire
Male actors from Surrey
Male actors from Yorkshire
People from Chertsey
21st-century English male actors